"Cheater" is a  science fiction story by American writer Orson Scott Card, set in his Ender's Game universe.  It tells the story of how "Hot Soup" Han Tzu got into Battle School.  It appears in Card's Webzine InterGalactic Medicine Show.

Plot summary
"Cheater" is the story of Han Tzu as a child.  Han Tzu was born in Nanyang, Henan, China and was a descendant of Yuan Shikai, a great Chinese general.  From a very young age, Han Tzu's father would play with him every day.  It was his wish that Han Tzu would become a great general and bring glory back to China.  When he got a little older, tutors began to come to his house to play games with him.  After a while, Han Tzu discovered that the games were actually to prepare him for a test.  One day, his tutor began teaching Han Tzu games from a list that his father had provided.  When the testers from the International Fleet showed up to give Han Tzu the test, he figured out that his father was cheating.  Han Tzu didn't want to pretend to be the best so he answered all but the first three questions wrong.  The next day, the people from the International Fleet showed up at Han Tzu's house and arrested his father for cheating but decided to test Han Tzu again, thus discovering how smart he really is.

Characters
Han Tzu
Han Tzu's father – Han Pei-mu
Han Tzu's mama – unnamed and not appearing
Tutors 
Wei Dun-nuan – language tutor
Shen Guo-rong – testing tutor
Boys to play with – unnamed
Girls to play with – unnamed
Mu-ren – household cook
Pei-tian – father's driver
International Fleet testers – unnamed
Soldier – unnamed

Audio
In addition to the text version of the story, "Cheater" is also available from InterGalactic Medicine Show as an audio download.  The story was read by Orson Scott Card himself.

Publication history
"Cheater" was published in the October 2006 issue of Intergalactic Medicine Show.  It also appears in the anthology Orson Scott Card's InterGalactic Medicine Show.

References

Ender's Game series short stories
Short stories by Orson Scott Card
Works originally published in InterGalactic Medicine Show
Short stories set in Henan
Cultural depictions of Chinese men
2006 short stories
Short stories set in the future